Sea Mere, Hingham is a  biological Site of Special Scientific Interest close to the town of Hingham in Norfolk.

The site has a natural circular kettle hole mere which was formed during the Holocene period approximately 10,000 years ago and covers  together with areas of fen, grazing marsh and woodland. The fen has a rich variety of flora including saw sedge, marsh pennywort, yellow loosestrife, yellow iris and the rare green figwort.

The grounds are open for group and school visits by appointment only and occasionally in aid of charity

References

Sites of Special Scientific Interest in Norfolk
Hingham, Norfolk